Haiti competed at the 1932 Summer Olympics in Los Angeles, United States. The country's delegation consisted of two track and field athletes, André Theard and Sylvio Cator. Cator had previously won a silver medal at the 1928 Olympics.

Athletics results 

Men's 100 meters
 André Theard
 Round 1 — ≥ 10.9 seconds (→ did not advance)

Men's broad jump
 Sylvio Cator — 5.93 meters (→ 9th place)

References
Official Olympic Reports

Nations at the 1932 Summer Olympics
1932
Summer Olympics